was an early Heian period jōsaku-style Japanese castle located in what is now the town of Kanegasaki in Isawa District, Iwate Prefecture in far northern Honshū, Japan. The site was proclaimed a National Historic Site of Japan in October 2013.

Background
In the late Nara period, after the establishment of a centralized government under the Ritsuryō system, the Yamato court sent a number of military expeditions to what is now the Tōhoku region of northern Japan to bring the local Emishi tribes under its control. The Abe clan eventually began to raid territories south of their border. In 1051 Abe no Yoritoki led an army into northern Miyagi and defeated a government army that had been sent to stop the raids. This event triggered the Former Nine Years' War (Zenkunen War. Abe no Yoritoki constructed twelve jōsaku-style fortresses against the Minamoto clan, whose leader Minamoto no Yoriyoshi was deputized as the Chinjufu Shogun  and sent at the head of a new army to assert central government control over their territories. Of these twelve fortifications, only that of the Tonami Palisade is known. The fortification was assigned to Abe no Yoritoki's third son, Abe no Munetō. In July 1057, Abe no Yoritoki was hit by a stray arrow, and retreated to the Tonami Palisade where he died. In 1061, Abe no Munetō defeated the Minamoto forces in the Battle of Tonomi Palisade.

Yoritoki's sons continued fighting for a time but were finally overwhelmed by combined Minamoto and Kiyowara armies in 1062.

Description
Tonomi Palisade is located approximately 2.5 kilometers west-northwest of the conjunction of the Kitakami River and the Isawa River. It was a roughly rectangular enclosure, approximately 500 meters north-south by 300 meters east-west, surrounded by an earthen rampart surmounted by a wooden palisade and moat. Nothing remains of Tonomi Palisade today. The Tohoku Expressway cuts through the middle of site, which is also bordered on one side by Japan National Route 4.  The site has been excavated some 19 times between 1958 and 2012, and was backfilled after each excavation. The site is located about 10 minutes by car from Kanegasaki Station on the JR East Tohoku Main Line.

See also
Emishi
Taga Castle
List of Historic Sites of Japan (Iwate)

References

External links
Kanegasaki official home page 
Cultural Treasures of Iwate Prefecture 

Castles in Iwate Prefecture
Ruined castles in Japan
History of Iwate Prefecture
11th-century establishments in Japan
Kanegasaki, Iwate
Historic Sites of Japan
Archaeological sites in Japan
Mutsu Province